Christoph Küffer (born 8 April 1968) is a Swiss rower. He competed in the men's coxless pair event at the 1992 Summer Olympics.

References

External links
 

1968 births
Living people
Swiss male rowers
Olympic rowers of Switzerland
Rowers at the 1992 Summer Olympics
20th-century Swiss people